The 2018 ABN AMRO World Tennis Tournament (or Rotterdam Open) was a men's tennis tournament played on indoor hard courts. It took place at the Rotterdam Ahoy arena in the Dutch city of Rotterdam, between 12 and 18 February 2018. It was the 45th edition of the tournament, and part of the ATP World Tour 500 series of the 2018 ATP World Tour. The tournament also includes a Men's Wheelchair Tennis Singles and Doubles draw. The wheelchair tennis event was an ITF-1 level tournament, with a total of $32,000 prize money.

Points and prize money

Point distribution

Prize money 

1 Qualifiers prize money is also the Round of 32 prize money
* per team

Singles main-draw entrants

Seeds 

1 Rankings as of February 5, 2018.

Other entrants 
The following players received wildcards into the main draw:
  Félix Auger-Aliassime
  Thiemo de Bakker
  Roger Federer
  Tallon Griekspoor

The following player received entry as a special exempt:
  Marius Copil

The following players received entry from the qualifying draw:
  Ruben Bemelmans
  Pierre-Hugues Herbert 
  Martin Kližan 
  Daniil Medvedev

The following players received entry as lucky losers:
  Nicolas Mahut
  Andreas Seppi

Withdrawals
Before the tournament
  Roberto Bautista Agut → replaced by  João Sousa
  Nick Kyrgios → replaced by  Viktor Troicki
  Jo-Wilfried Tsonga → replaced by  Andreas Seppi
  Benoît Paire → replaced by  Nicolas Mahut

During the tournament
  Tomáš Berdych

Retirements
  Richard Gasquet
  David Goffin

Doubles main-draw entrants

Seeds 

1 Rankings as of February 5, 2018.

Other entrants 
The following pairs received wildcards into the doubles main draw:
  Robin Haase /  Matwé Middelkoop 
  Jasper Smit /  Jesse Timmermans

The following pair received entry from the qualifying draw:
  Sander Arends /  Thiemo de Bakker

Finals

Singles 

  Roger Federer defeated  Grigor Dimitrov, 6–2, 6–2

Doubles 

  Pierre-Hugues Herbert /  Nicolas Mahut  defeated  Oliver Marach /  Mate Pavić, 2–6, 6–2, [10–7]

References

External links